Frank James Lindsay Bury (1910 – 11 July 1944) was a British composer.  He studied music at Cambridge University and attended the Royal College of Music, where he was a student of Malcolm Sargent and Gordon Jacob.  Bury also studied under Bruno Walter.

Bury was the founder of the Ludlow Choral Society.  He was killed in July 1944 while serving as a commando during the Normandy airborne landings.

Among his works is a Prelude and Fugue in E flat for two pianos.

References

Frank Bury piano music – DIVERSITY
March, Ivan; Edward Greenfield; Robert Layton (2001).  The Penguin Guide to Compact Discs 2002 Edition, London, New York City:  Penguin Books.  

1910 births
1944 deaths
British Army personnel killed in World War II
Royal Norfolk Regiment officers
British Army Commandos officers
20th-century classical musicians
20th-century English composers